"The Smile Behind the Veil" is the final episode of the 1969 ITC British television series Randall and Hopkirk (Deceased), starring Mike Pratt, Kenneth Cope, and Annette Andre. The episode was first broadcast on 13 March 1970 on the ITV and was directed by Jeremy Summers.

Synopsis

Cast
Mike Pratt as Jeff Randall
Kenneth Cope as Marty Hopkirk
Annette Andre as Jeannie Hopkirk
John Bott ...  Dyson
David Forbes ...  Police Constable
Robin Hawdon ...  Grant
George Howe ...  Brooks
Freda Jackson ...  Mrs. Evans
Clare Jenkins ...  Female Hiker
Peter Jesson ...  Hooper
Peter Lawrence ...  Policeman
Michael Radford ...  Male Hiker
Alex Scott ...  Seaton
Hilary Tindall ...  Cynthia
Gary Watson ...  Donald Seaton

Production
Although the 26th and final episode in the series, The Smile Behind the Veil was the 7th episode to be shot, filmed between August and September 1968.

References

External links

Episode overview at Randallandhopkirk.org.uk
Filming locations at Randallandhopkirk.org.uk

Randall and Hopkirk (Deceased) episodes
1970 British television episodes